Out of Tune is a British children's TV sitcom which was shown on CBBC from 1996 to 1998.

It features a group of fictional children that belong to a church choir at a school and their practice sessions. However the choir is humorously bad, and the practice sessions are often interrupted by one thing or another. The show aired at 4:35 on BBC1 on Tuesday and Wednesday and it had a total of 40 episodes over three series. The first series started on 14 February 1996 and finished on 4 June later that year. The last episode was aired on 9 June 1998.

Ratings (CBBC Channel)
Sunday 10 March 2002: 30,000

References

External links

BBC children's television shows
BBC television sitcoms
1996 British television series debuts
1998 British television series endings
1990s British children's television series